The Russian Second Division 2009 was the third strongest division in Russian football. The Second Division is geographically divided into 5 zones.
The winners of each zone are automatically promoted into the First Division. The bottom finishers of each zone lose professional status and are relegated into the Amateur Football League.

South

FC Abinsk were excluded from the league for failing to fulfil two fixtures (on 28 June and 5 July). They have played 14 matches and were in the 18th position with 5 points. Results of Abinsk were discarded.

On 31 July 2009 Oleg Mikheyev, president of FC Rotor Volgograd, announced Rotor's resignation from the league, citing problems with authorities. They have played 18 games and were in the 13th position with 21 points.

Standings

Top scorers
Source: [PFL] , Sporbox.ru 
23 goals
 Aleksei Zhdanov (Volgograd) (3 - from penalty kick)
22 goals
 Stanislav Dubrovin (Zhemchuzhina-Sochi) (4 - from penalty kick)
20 goals
 Robert Zebelyan (Zhemchuzhina-Sochi) (1 - from penalty kick)
19 goals
 Sergei Verkashanskiy (Torpedo Armavir) (7 - from penalty kick)
16 goals
 Azamat Kurachinov (Stavropol) (6 - from penalty kick)
13 goals
 Mikhail Markosov (SKA / Stavropol)
 Stanislav Lebedintsev (SKA) (1 - from penalty kick)
 Mikhail Surshkov (Druzhba) (2 - from penalty kick)
12 goals
 Ivan Grinyuk (Bataysk-2007)
 Timirlan Shavanov (Dagdizel) (2 - from penalty kick)

West

Standings

Top scorers
Source: [PFL] 
17 goals
 Andrei Opanasyuk (Dynamo Vologda)
16 goals
 Azamat Gonezhukov (Dynamo St. Petersburg)
 Vadim Klass (Sever)
15 goals
 Artyom Lopatkin (Tekstilshchik)
 Anton Proshin (Spartak Kostroma)
 Dmitri Vyazmikin (Torpedo Vladimir)
13 goals
 Yuri Kapusta (Nara-ShBFR)
 Anton Kryuchkov (Volochanin-Ratmir)
 Stanislav Murygin (Istra)
12 goals
 Sergei Lokhanov (Volochanin-Ratmir)
 Maksim Protserov (Dynamo St. Petersburg)
 Vladimir Svizhuk (Istra)

Center
First games on April 22, last games on October 28.

Standings

Top scorers
Source: [PFL] 
17 goals
 Mikhail Tyufyakov (Dynamo Bryansk)
16 goals
 Sergei Faustov (FC Gubkin)
13 goals
 Aleksei Gavrilov (Ryazan)
12 goals
 Kirill Makarov (FSA)
11 goals
 Igor Borozdin (Avangard Kursk)
 Andrei Meshchaninov (Zvezda)

Ural-Povolzhye

Standings

Top scorers
Source: [PFL] 
19 goals
 Ruslan Mukhametshin (SOYUZ-Gazprom / Mordovia)
14 goals
 Ivan Luzhnikov (Mordovia / FC Tyumen)
 Dmitri Sysuyev (Mordovia)
13 goals
 Marat Shogenov (Gazovik)
12 goals
 Vitali Burmakov (Volga Ulyanovsk)
11 goals
 Marat Safin (Volga Ulyanovsk)
 Dmitri Zarva (FC Tyumen)

East

Standings

Top scorers
Source: [PFL] 
15 goals
 Valentin Yegunov (Metallurg-Kuzbass)
14 goals
 Yevgeni Yaroslavtsev (Metallurg-Kuzbass)
11 goals
 Anton Bagayev (Irtysh)
10 goals
 Aleksei Alekseyevtsev (Sakhalin)
 Stanislav Goncharov (Metallurg)
 Dmitri Turutin (Sibiryak)
8 goals
 Aleksei Bazanov (Metallurg)
 Dmitri Galin (Sibiryak)
 Maksim Galiullin (Dynamo Barnaul)
 Aleksei Martynov (Metallurg)
 Anton Vasilyev (Irtysh)

Awards
On November 25, 2009, Professional Football League announced the award winners for the season.

Zone West

 Best player: Dmitri Vyazmikin (FC Torpedo Vladimir).
 Best goalkeeper: Andrei Romanov (FC Spartak Kostroma).
 Best defender:  Emin Agaev (FC Volga Tver).
 Best midfielder: Aleksei Melyoshin (FC Torpedo-ZIL Moscow).
 Best striker: Andrei Opanasyuk (FC Dynamo Vologda).
 Best manager:  Eduard Malofeyev (FC Dynamo Saint-Petersburg).

Zone Center

 Best player: Mikhail Tyufyakov (FC Dynamo Bryansk).
 Best goalkeeper: Valeri Chizhov (FC Avangard Kursk).
 Best defender: Maksim Tishchenko (FC Avangard Kursk).
 Best midfielder: Igor Borozdin (FC Avangard Kursk).
 Best striker: Mikhail Tyufyakov.
 Best manager: Valeri Yesipov (FC Avangard Kursk).

Zone South

 Best player: Oleg Veretennikov (FC Volgograd).
 Best goalkeeper: Aleksandr Chikhradze (FC Zhemchuzhina-Sochi).
 Best defender: Konstantin Gordiyuk (FC Zhemchuzhina-Sochi).
 Best midfielder: Oleg Veretennikov.
 Best striker: Aleksei Zhdanov (FC Volgograd).
 Best manager: Oleg Vasilenko (FC Zhemchuzhina-Sochi).

Zone Ural-Povolzhye

 Best player: Ruslan Mukhametshin (FC Mordovia Saransk).
 Best goalkeeper: Fyodor Dyachenko (FC Mordovia Saransk).
 Best defender: Aleksei Muldarov (FC Mordovia Saransk).
 Best midfielder: Marat Shogenov (FC Gazovik Orenburg).
 Best striker: Ruslan Mukhametshin.
 Best manager: Fyodor Shcherbachenko (FC Mordovia Saransk).

Zone East

 Best player: Valentin Yegunov (FC Metallurg-Kuzbass Novokuznetsk).
 Best goalkeeper: Aleksei Krasnokutskiy (FC Irtysh Omsk).
 Best defender: Sergei Pyatikopov (FC Metallurg Krasnoyarsk).
 Best midfielder: Yevgeni Andreyev (FC Irtysh Omsk).
 Best striker: Valentin Yegunov.
 Best manager: Aleksandr Ivchenko (FC Metallurg Krasnoyarsk).

References

3
Russian Second League seasons
Russia
Russia